The Morro do Diabo State Park is a state park in the state of São Paulo, Brazil.
It protects an area of Atlantic Forest in a region that has lost most of its forest coverage over the last century, and protects the endemic endangered black lion tamarin

Location

The Morro do Diabo State Park is in the municipality of Teodoro Sampaio in the Pontal do Paranapanema region,  from the state capital of São Paulo.
The park has tropical seasonal semi-deciduous vegetation.
The park lets visitors have direct contact with nature in a sustainable manner, and supports environmental education and scientific research.
The park would be part of the proposed Trinational Biodiversity Corridor, which aims to provide forest connections between conservation units in Brazil, Paraguay and Argentina in the Upper Paraná ecoregion.

Environment

The park preserves one of the last large areas of the country's upland forest, with the original regional ecosystems.
The climate is type CWA.
Rainfall is mostly in the summer, averaging .
The park preserves an area of Atlantic Forest in good condition.
It has a large reserve of Aspidosperma polyneuron trees, important for reforestation and recovery of degraded areas.
It is home to endangered species such as  tapir, peccary, howler monkey, puma and jaguar, and one of the most threatened of all primates, the black lion tamarin, with an estimated 1,200 members of this species.

History

European occupation of the Pontal do Paranapanema region began in earnest when the Sorocabana Railway reached the Paraná River in 1917.
Urban centers were built along the railway and intensive logging began, followed by farming of coffee, cotton, peanuts and cattle.
The state government created the Morro do Diabo Forest Reserve in 1941, now the Morro do Diabo State Park.
In 1942 the  Great Pontal Reserve and the São Paulo Lagoon Reserve were created.
Over the years that followed these two reserves were invaded by squatters and deforested, often with government support.
The forest reserve became a state park in 1986.

Fishing regulations were published on 2 October 2008, covering conservation areas and their buffer zones in the Paraná River basin.
They were the Morro do Diabo State Park, Rio do Peixe State Park, Rio Aguapeí State Park, Mico-Leão-Preto Ecological Station, Ivinhema State Park, Ilha Grande National Park, Caiuá Ecological Station and Iguaçu National Park.

Notes

Sources

State parks of Brazil
Protected areas of São Paulo (state)
1941 establishments in Brazil
Protected areas of the Atlantic Forest